In molecular biology mir-938 microRNA is a short RNA molecule. MicroRNAs function to regulate the expression levels of other genes by several mechanisms.

miR-938 and the TGF-β pathway
miR-938 has been found to directly target the SMAD3 gene, which encodes the main downstream TGF-β polypeptide SMAD3. This microRNA is overexpressed in non-functioning pituitary adenomas (NFPAs) compared with normal pituitary tissue. Downregulation of TGF-β signalling is likely to play a role in the regulation of signalling pathways in NFPA tumorigenesis, thus also implicating SMAD3 and miR-938.

See also 
 MicroRNA

References

Further reading

External links
 

MicroRNA
MicroRNA precursor families